The Mango Tree is a novel by Australian author Ronald McKie. In 1974, it won the Miles Franklin Award. In 1977, it was adapted into a film of the same name. The story follows the childhood of a young man, named Jamie, growing up in a country town in Australia during the early 20th century.

References

1974 Australian novels
Miles Franklin Award-winning works
William Collins, Sons books